Francis Cogswell (August 19, 1887 – September 22, 1939) was a captain in the United States Navy who served in World War I and was a Navy Cross recipient.

Early life
Cogswell was born in Portsmouth, New Hampshire, the son of Rear Admiral James Kelsey Cogswell.

Navy career
He was appointed to the United States Naval Academy in 1903, and graduated in 1908.

Cogswell's Navy Cross citation reads:

The Navy Cross is awarded to Lieutenant Commander Francis Cogswell, U.S. Navy, for distinguished service in the line of his profession as commanding officer of the U.S.S. Fanning and the U.S.S. McDougal, engaged in the important, exacting and hazardous duty of patrolling the waters infested with enemy submarines and mines, in escorting and protecting vitally important convoys of troops and supplies through these waters, and in offensive and defensive action, vigorously and unremittingly prosecuted against all forms of enemy naval activity.

Cogswell was Naval attaché in Paris, France, in the late 1930s.

Captain Cogswell died at Puget Sound Naval Hospital, Bremerton, Washington, on 22 September 1939.

Personal life
He married Grace Woodman Phillips (1887–1971) of New York City. She had previously been married to pioneer aviator, Henry Post, who died in an air crash in 1914, after establishing a new altitude record. She worked for the US Foreign Service and later for the Central Intelligence Agency until her retirement in 1954. They had no children.

USS Cogswell
The ship is named in honor of Rear Admiral James Kelsey Cogswell, who served during the Spanish–American War, and his son, Captain Francis Cogswell.

References
 USS McDougal page
 University of Alaska page
 

1887 births
1939 deaths
Recipients of the Navy Cross (United States)
United States Naval Academy alumni
United States Navy officers
United States Navy personnel of World War I
Burials at Arlington National Cemetery
People from Portsmouth, New Hampshire